The Mittelallalin is a minor summit below the Allalinhorn situated above Saas Fee. This place is well known for the revolving restaurant which is the highest in the world and a glacier cave.

Access

Mittelallalin can be reached easily by cable car from Saas Fee to the Felskinn intermediate station and finally to the top with the Metro Alpin, the highest funicular in the world.

Ski and mountain-climbing
From there the ascent of Allalinhorn  is very popular and can be done in just two hours.

See also
 List of ski areas and resorts in Switzerland
 Swiss Alps

References

External links
 Saas Fee tourism

Mountains of the Alps
Alpine three-thousanders
Mountains of Valais
Tourist attractions in Switzerland
Buildings and structures with revolving restaurants
Mountains of Switzerland